Bredenfelde is a municipality in the Mecklenburgische Seenplatte district, in Mecklenburg-Vorpommern, Germany.

References

External links

Municipalities in Mecklenburg-Western Pomerania
Grand Duchy of Mecklenburg-Strelitz